The 1987 Kent Cup was an invitational non-ranking snooker tournament held in Beijing from 5 to 8 March 1987. The invited competitors were seven players managed by Barry Hearn's Matchroom Sport, and also Rex Williams and eight Chinese amateur players. Willie Thorne won the tournament, defeating Jimmy White 5–2 in the final, which was watched by over 100 million television viewers in China.

Main draw

References

Kent Cup (snooker)
Kent Cup
Kent Cup
Kent Cup